Udo Böckmann (born 15 July 1952) is a retired German football midfielder.

References

External links
 

1952 births
Living people
German footballers
Bundesliga players
VfL Bochum players
VfL Bochum II players
Bonner SC players
Association football midfielders